The Elli-class frigates are a series of frigates operated by the Hellenic Navy. The first two ships (Elli and Limnos), which have lengthened hangars and different armament were built specifically for the Hellenic Navy. The remaining ships are ex-Royal Netherlands Navy S-frigates of the Kortenaer class transferred to the Hellenic Navy in the 1990s and early 2000s. These robust and reliable ships constitute the backbone of the Hellenic Navy. , for which the class is named, is itself named after two famous Greek cruisers, one of which was sunk during World War II.

Mid-life modernization project
There was a mid life modernization programme for six of the ten Greek ships which started in 2004 and was completed in 2009. The program was performed at Hellenic Shipyards and the upgraded frigates were the following: Kountouriotis (F-462), Adrias (F-459), Navarinon (F-461), Limnos (F-451), Elli (F-450), and Aegaeon (F-460).

The main modernization work included the following:
Replacement of the combat management system with the Thales TACTICOS
Installation of new sensors, like the Thales Mirador electro-optical target tracker
Installation of Thales Scout MkII LPI navigation radar
Overhaul and improvement of radars (WM25 and LW08 long range air-search radar)
Installation of EDO (now part of Harris Corporation) CS-3701 ESM system
Replacement of navigation systems and upgrade of communications systems
Replacement of propulsion control system and of defined platform systems.

Bouboulina (F-463) was decommissioned on 18 February 2013. It will be used as a source for spare parts.

Incidents at sea
On 2 November 2017 Kanaris ran aground near the islet Atalanti, southwest of Psyttaleia in the Saronic Gulf, on the way back to the Salamis Naval Base. There were no personnel injuries and no fuel leaks but there was serious hull damage which according to news reports affected the SONAR shell. After 8 months of absence for repairs the ship was again operational in July 2018 using the SONAR and dome from decommissioned Bouboulina (F-463).

Ships

In popular culture 
Four Elli-class frigates stood in for Hydra class frigates with the fictitious names Demeter, Nereus, Proteus and Triton in the season 4  of the post-apocalyptic action drama TNT series The Last Ship. Although called Hydra class, the ships shown are clearly Elli class frigates (mast construction with specific WM25 radar is a clear distinction).

Gallery

References

External links
Elli class frigates
Royal Schelde Group info on Standard Frigate (Kortenaer class)
Παράδοση Φ/Γ ΚΟΥΝΤΟΥΡΙΩΤΗΣ F462 
hellenic-shipyards
HS ELLI (F-450)3d video

Frigate classes